César González (born 28 February 1989 Morón, Buenos Aires, Argentina), (also known as  Camilo Blajaquis) is an Argentinian poet and cinematographer.  He is often referred to as "el poeta villero" (the poet from the ghetto). 

González published his first book, La Venganza del Cordero Atado, in 2010, soon after completing imprisonment in a youth detention center for the fourth time.

Referring to his legal problems, González  has labelled to himself as "the exception that confirms the rule".

A student of Gilles Deleuze, Pierre Bourdieu and Michel Foucault, González's work often civersthe issues of social stigmatization towards the villas or ghettos both in Argentina and the rest of the world, and the violence of the jail system.

González also writes for magazines and music video productions for rappers like "El As" (from Fuerte Apache) Fili Wey (from Puerta de Hierro) and Alan Garvey (as González, from Villa Gardel).

References

External links
Cesar González' official blog
Cesar González at IMDb

1989 births
Living people
Argentine male poets
21st-century Argentine poets
21st-century Argentine male writers
20th-century Argentine poets
20th-century Argentine male writers
Writers from Buenos Aires
Argentine cinematographers